Presenting Joe Williams and Thad Jones/Mel Lewis, the Jazz Orchestra is a 1966 big band jazz album recorded by Joe Williams with the Thad Jones/Mel Lewis Jazz Orchestra and released on the Solid State Records label.

Track listing
LP side A:
"Get Out of My Life Woman" (Toussaint) – 3:21
"Woman's Got Soul" (Mayfield) – 2:22
"Nobody Knows the Way I Feel This Morning" (Delaney, Delaney) – 4:30
"Gee Baby, Ain't I Good to You" (Razaf, Redman) – 2:52
"How Sweet It Is (To Be Loved by You)" (Dozier, Holland, Holland) – 2:32
"Keep Your Hand on Your Heart" (Broonzy) – 3:37
LP side B:
"Evil Man Blues" (Feather, Hampton) – 3:26
"Come Sunday" (Ellington) – 3:16
"Smack Dab in the Middle" (Calhoun) – 3:29
"It Don't Mean a Thing (If It Ain't Got That Swing)" (Ellington, Mills) – 3:04
"Hallelujah I Love Her So" (Charles) – 3:01
"Night Time Is the Right Time (to Be With the One You Love)" (Sykes) – 5:13

Personnel
 Joe Williams – vocals
 Thad Jones – flugelhorn
 Mel Lewis – drums
 Richard Davis – bass
 Roland Hanna – piano
 Sam Herman – guitar
 Jerome Richardson – saxophone
 Jerry Dodgion – saxophone
 Joe Farrell – saxophone
 Eddie Daniels – saxophone
 Pepper Adams – saxophone
 Richard Williams – trumpet
 Bill Berry – trumpet
 Jimmy Nottingham – trumpet
 Snooky Young – trumpet
 Bob Brookmeyer – trombone
 Garnett Brown – trombone
 Tom McIntosh – trombone
 Cliff Heather – trombone

References and external links
Solid State SS-18008
Allmusic, Scott Yanow review ([ link])

Joe Williams (jazz singer) albums
The Thad Jones/Mel Lewis Orchestra albums
1966 albums
Solid State Records (jazz label) albums